Baby Deltic may refer to:

 British Rail Class 23 locomotive
 Napier Deltic T9-29 engine used to power them, a half-sized variant of the original Deltic engine